V-League 2008 was the 52nd season of Vietnam's professional football league. The league was held from January 6, 2008 to August 24, 2008. Petro Vietnam was the league sponsor for the second season (Since 2007).

Bình Dương F.C. won their second titles in this season.

League table

Top scorer

Awards

Monthly awards

Dream Team

Manager  Vương Tiến Dũng (Xi Măng Hải Phòng)

Play-off

External links
Vietnam Football Federation

Vietnamese Super League seasons
Vietnam
Vietnam
1